Charles S. Fuchs is an American oncologist. From 2016 to 2021 he was director of the Yale Cancer Center in New Haven, Connecticut, Sackler professor of medicine at the Yale School of Medicine, and physician-in-chief of the Smilow Cancer Hospital. He left Yale to work for the Hoffman-La Roche group of companies. From 1987 to 1993 he was a resident at Brigham and Women’s Hospital.

He has worked on gastrointestinal cancers and on cancer epidemiology, and has published results of research on colorectal cancer.

References

External links
Charles Fuchs, faculty profile, Yale School of Medicine

Year of birth missing (living people)
Living people
American oncologists
Harvard Medical School alumni
Harvard School of Public Health alumni
Yale School of Medicine faculty